Switzerland competed at the 1936 Summer Olympics in Berlin, Germany. 190 competitors, 184 men and 6 women, took part in 100 events in 21 sports.

Medalists

Gold
 Georges Miez — Gymnastics, Men's Floor Exercises

Silver
 Arthur Tell Schwab — Athletics, Men's 50 km Walk
 Edgar Buchwalder, Ernst Nievergelt and Kurt Ott — Cycling, Men's Team Road Race
 Eugen Mack — Gymnastics, Men's All-Around Individual 
 Michael Reusch — Gymnastics, Men's Parallel Bars
 Eugen Mack — Gymnastics, Men's Long Horse Vault 
 Eugen Mack — Gymnastics, Men's Pommeled Horse 
 Josef Walter — Gymnastics, Men's Floor Exercises
 Albert Bachmann, Walter Bach, Eugen Mack, Georges Miez, Michael Reusch, and Edi Steinemann — Gymnastics, Men's Team Combined Exercises 
 Hermann Betschart, Alex Homberger, Hans Homberger, Karl Schmid, and Rolf Spring — Rowing, Men's Coxed Fours

Bronze
 Ernst Nievergelt — Cycling, Men's Individual Road Race 
 Albert Bachmann — Gymnastics, Men's Pommeled Horse
 Eugen Mack — Gymnastics, Men's Floor Exercises 
 Max Bloesch, Rolf Fäs, Willy Gysi, Erland Herkenrath, Ernst Hufschmid, Willy Hufschmid, Werner Meyer, Georg Mischon, Willy Schäfer, Werner Scheurmann, Edy Schmid, Erich Schmitt, Eugen Seiterle, Max Streib, Robert Studer, and Rudolf Wirz — Handball, Men's Team Competition
 Hermann Betschart, Alex Homberger, Hans Homberger, and Karl Schmid — Rowing, Men's Coxless Fours

Athletics

Basketball

Boxing

Canoeing

Cycling

Eleven cyclists, all men, represented Switzerland in 1936.

Individual road race
 Ernst Nievergelt
 Edgar Buchwalder
 Kurt Ott
 Gottlieb Weber

Team road race
 Ernst Nievergelt
 Edgar Buchwalder
 Kurt Ott
 Gottlieb Weber

Sprint
 Werner Wägelin

Time trial
 Edy Baumann

Tandem
 Karl Burkhart
 Fritz Ganz

Team pursuit
 Walter Richli
 Ernst Fuhrimann
 Albert Kägi
 Werner Wägelin

Diving

Equestrian

Fencing

18 fencers, 15 men and 3 women, represented Switzerland in 1936.

Men's foil
 Michel Fauconnet
 Gottfried von Meiss
 Jean Rubli

Men's team foil
 Michel Fauconnet, Édouard Fitting, Jean Rubli, Gottfried von Meiss, Constantin Antoniades

Men's épée
 Frédéric Fitting
 Jean Hauert
 François Duret

Men's team épée
 Jean Hauert, Édouard Fitting, Frédéric Fitting, Edmond Göldlin, Paul de Graffenried, Charles Hauert

Men's sabre
 Adolf Stocker
 Charles Glasstetter
 Alphonse Ruckstuhl

Men's team sabre
 Charles Glasstetter, Alphonse Ruckstuhl, Walter Widemann, Adolf Stocker

Women's foil
 Ingeborg Scheel
 Denise Kramer-Scholer
 Yvonne Bornand

Field hockey

Gymnastics

Handball

Modern pentathlon

Three male pentathletes represented Switzerland in 1936.

 Karl Wyss
 Willy Grundbacher
 Hans Baumann

Rowing

Switzerland had 16 rowers participate in seven out of seven rowing events in 1936.

 Men's single sculls
 Ernst Rufli

 Men's double sculls
 Kurt Haas
 Eugen Studach

 Men's coxless pair
 Wilhelm Klopfer
 Karl Müller

 Men's coxed pair
 Georges Gschwind
 Hans Appenzeller
 Rolf Spring (cox)

 Men's coxless four
 Hermann Betschart
 Hans Homberger
 Alex Homberger
 Karl Schmid

 Men's coxed four
 Hermann Betschart
 Hans Homberger
 Alex Homberger
 Karl Schmid
 Rolf Spring (cox)

 Men's eight
 Werner Schweizer
 Fritz Feldmann
 Rudolf Homberger
 Oskar Neuenschwander
 Hermann Betschart
 Hans Homberger
 Alex Homberger
 Karl Schmid
 Rolf Spring (cox)

Sailing

Swimming

Water polo

Weightlifting

Wrestling

Aeronautics

Alpinism

Art competitions

References

External links
Official Olympic Reports
International Olympic Committee results database

Nations at the 1936 Summer Olympics
1936
1936 in Swiss sport